Skeleton at the Feast is the debut live album of Gary Lucas, released in 1991 through Enemy Records.

Track listing

Personnel 
Greg Calbi – mastering
Jon Fox – recording
Carla Gahr – photography
Walter Horn – keyboards on "Music for the Golem"
Tim Kalliches – recording
Gary Lucas – electric guitar, acoustic guitar, production, engineering, recording
Jasper Nöe – recording
Team Romamoto – design
Marion Rosendahl – photography
Jon Wells – recording

References 

 

1991 debut albums
1991 live albums
Gary Lucas albums
Enemy Records live albums